Michael Gerard McKillop  (born 27 January 1990 in Ballymena, Northern Ireland) is an Irish middle distance runner. He competes in the T37 disability sport classification, as he has a mild form of cerebral palsy.

He won the 800m title at the 2006 IPC Athletics World Championships, clocking just over 2:02. and he represented Ireland at the 2008 Summer Paralympics, winning a gold medal at the T37 800 m clipping almost three seconds off his previous mark as he strode to an emphatic win in 1:59.41. His time was a Paralympic record. McKillop won the 800 m title at the 2011 IPC Athletics World Championships in world-record time of 1:58.90, he also set a 1500 m world record but was not awarded a medal because of the lack of entries. in the London 2012 Paralympics, McKillop won gold for the men's 800 meter t37 with a time of 1:57.22; this was a world record.  He won the 1500m T37 race in the 2012 London Paralympics. The medal was later presented to him by his mother, Catherine McKillop, an ambassador of Procter & Gamble. He defended his 1500m T37 title at the 2016 Rio Paralympics securing the gold medal once again.

He is coached by his father Paddy, who was awarded Northern Ireland Sports Coach of the Year. McKillop has a personal best in his preferred 800 metres of 1:57.22.

In 2012, McKillop was awarded the Whang Youn Dai Achievement Award.

McKillop was appointed Member of the Order of the British Empire (MBE) in the 2020 New Year Honours for services to disability awareness and athletics in Northern Ireland.

Personal life
McKillop works as a fitness instructor and motivational speaker. He was inducted into the Suffolk Sports Hall of Fame on Long Island with the Class of 1993.

See also
2012 Olympics gold post boxes in the United Kingdom

References 

Paralympic athletes of Ireland
Paralympic gold medalists for Ireland
Athletes (track and field) at the 2008 Summer Paralympics
Cerebral Palsy category Paralympic competitors
Track and field athletes with cerebral palsy
Sportspeople from Ballymena
1990 births
Living people
Athletes (track and field) at the 2012 Summer Paralympics
World record holders in Paralympic athletics
Medalists at the 2008 Summer Paralympics
Medalists at the 2012 Summer Paralympics
Athletes (track and field) at the 2016 Summer Paralympics
Medalists at the 2016 Summer Paralympics
Members of the Order of the British Empire
Paralympic medalists in athletics (track and field)
Athletes (track and field) at the 2020 Summer Paralympics
Irish male middle-distance runners